Modest Fok was a R&B band that was created in Atlanta, Georgia, in 1980 by Debra Killings, James Killings Jr, and William "Vybe Chyle" Burke. The band was previously known as Princess & Starbreeze was signed to Eastwest Records in the 1990s. Their debut album Love or the Single Life was released in 1992 and scored two minor R&B hits on the Billboard Hot R&B/Hip-Hop Singles & Tracks chart.

The band made their debut on the Billboard charts on July 11, 1992, when "Promise Me" entered the R&B chart at number 99.

Discography

Albums

Singles

Band members
Current members
Debra Killings – lead vocals, bass guitar, lead guitar, Keyboards (1980–present)
James Killings Jr – musical director, backing vocals, lead vocals, bass guitar, lead guitar, Keyboards (1980–present)
Wesley B Allen – keyboards, lead vocals, backing vocals (1982–present)
Kenneth Wright – keyboards, backing vocals (1985–present)
Donald Lee Simpson – lead vocals (1984–present)
Carol E Killings - Artist Management
Carol "Dee Dee" Killings - Hair Stylist

Former members
William "Vybe Chyle" Burke – drums, programming, production manager, talent agent (1980–1990)
Alvin J Speights - audio engineer (1984–1990)
Monyea Z Crawford - lighting director, crew chief (1984–1990)
Geno Jordan - Road Manager
Larry Wimby - Lead vocals, backing vocals, trombone, choreographer, stylist
Thomas "Butch" Harris – lead vocals (1980–1984)
Marty Heyward – sax, keyboards, musical director (1980–1983)
Jerome Dukes - trombone, backing vocals
Rory Core - trumpet, trombone, backing vocals
Vernon Maddox - trumpet, trombone, backing vocals
Derrick Cleveland - trumpet, backing vocals
Max Spalding - keyboards, guitar, lead vocals, backing vocals

External links
[] Album and singles info, chart info and music video links.

References

American contemporary R&B musical groups